...In Black & White is the 11th solo studio album by American country artist Barbara Mandrell. The album was released in April 1982 on MCA Records and was produced by Tom Collins. It was Barbara Mandrell's first studio album in two years since the release of Love Is Fair.

Background and content
...In Black & White was recorded in January 1982 in Nashville, Tennessee, and consisted of 10 tracks of new material. Greg Adams of Allmusic compared the fourth track, "Till You're Gone" to Ronnie Milsap's number-one country single "Lost in the Fifties Tonight (In the Still of the Night)", saying that the track anticipated the "oily nostalgia...with its classic doo wop chord progression." The album mainly contained country pop-influenced ballads such as "Till You're Gone". Adams gave the album three out five stars, calling the album "uneven" in parts. He stated, "The album is marred by synthetic production and uneven material, particularly with regard to the preponderance of generic ballads that aren't rooted in any particular genre of music. Unless you're a completist, enjoy "Till You're Gone" on a greatest-hits collection and skip the rest."

...In Black & White was released on an LP album, with five songs on each side of the record.

Release
...In Black & White spawned two singles during the course of 1982. The lead single "'Till You're Gone" was released in April 1982 and peaked at number one on the Billboard Hot Country Songs chart, while also reaching number 25 on Billboards Hot Adult Contemporary Tracks chart. "'Till You're Gone" peaked also at number three on the Canadian RPM country chart. The second and final single "Operator, Long Distance Please" was released in August 1982 and reached number 9 on Billboards country singles chart and on Canada's RPM Country Tracks chart. The album was issued in 1982 and reached number seven on the Billboard Top Country Albums chart and #153 on the Billboard 200 albums chart.

Track listing

Personnel
Acoustic Guitar: Jimmy Capps, Fred Tackett
Background Vocals: Steve Brantley, Bruce Dees, Marcia Routh, Susan Storm, Marie Tomlinson, Barbara Wyrick
Bass Guitar: Mike Leech, Joe Osborn, Neil Stubenhaus, Bob Wray
Drums: Mike Baird, Buster Phillips
Duet Vocals: Gene Miller on "Black and White"
Electric Guitar: Pete Bordonali, Bruce Dees, B.B. King (track 10), Fred Newell, Marty Walsh
Harmonica: Charlie McCoy
Lead Vocals: Barbara Mandrell
Organ: Bobby Ogdin
Piano: David Briggs, Shane Keister, Bobby Ogdin
Saxophone: Ron Eades
Strings: The Nashville String Machine, The Sheldon Kurland Strings
String Arranger: D. Bergen White
Synthesizer: Shane Keister
Vibraphone: Charlie McCoy

Charts

Weekly charts

Year-end charts

Singles

References

1982 albums
Barbara Mandrell albums
MCA Records albums
Albums produced by Tom Collins (record producer)